Radiation sickness may refer to:

 Radiation Sickness (video), a video by the thrash metal band Nuclear Assault
 Radiation poisoning, a sickness caused by exposure to radiation